Kłodzko is a historic town in south-western Poland, in the region of Lower Silesia. It is situated in the centre of the Kłodzko Valley, on the Eastern Neisse river.

Kłodzko is the seat of Kłodzko County (and of the rural Gmina Kłodzko, although the town itself is a separate urban gmina), and is situated in Lower Silesian Voivodeship. With 26,845 inhabitants (2019), Kłodzko is the main commercial centre as well as an important transport and tourist node for the area.

For its historical monuments it is sometimes referred to as "Little Prague". It was established as a settlement in the 10th century, and is one of the oldest towns in Poland, having been granted city rights in 1233. Culturally and traditionally a part of Bohemia, administratively it has been a part of Silesia since 1763.

History

Prehistory
The area of present-day Kłodzko has been populated at least since the 1st century BC. There are several archaeological sites both in and around the town that indicate that there must have been a settlement located on the ancient Amber Road that conducted extensive trade relations with the Roman Empire.

Medieval Bohemia and Poland
The earliest mention of the town is in the 12th-century Chronicle of Bohemians by Cosmas of Prague. He mentions the town of Cladzco as belonging to duke Slavník, father of Adalbert of Prague, in 981. Initially in Bohemia, together with the Kłodzko Land, it changed affiliation several times, passing between Poland and Bohemia in a series of conflicts which in turn devastated the town completely by the beginning of the 12th century. In 1114 Bohemian Duke Soběslav I captured and burnt the town to the ground, but he rebuilt it shortly afterwards. He also rebuilt and strengthened the castle located on a high rock overlooking the town.

In 1241, Klodzko became the site of a Mongol raid during the Mongolian Invasion of Europe. However, King Wenceslaus I managed to rally his troops and drove the Mongols out, saving much of Bohemia from Mongolian conquest. The town was granted German city rights under Magdeburg Law between 1253 and 1278, though the exact date is unknown. In 1278 it came under Polish rule again, as it was taken over by the Silesian duke Henry Probus who claimed entire Bohemian Kingdom after death of Ottokar II of Bohemia. In 1290 it was sold to the Dukes of Świdnica and then, in 1301, it was sold to the Dukes of Ziębice. However, in 1334, Duke Boleslav II sold the town back to the Kingdom of Bohemia. The same year Bohemian king John of Luxembourg, relocated the town, which led to a period of fast growth, bringing German settlers to the town. A city hall was built in 1341, and in the following year a brick factory was opened. From 1366, the town has been protected by a group of professional firemen. The town gained significant profits from its location on the ancient road from Bohemia to Poland through mountain passes in the Sudetes.

German Augustinian monks were invited to the city and, in 1376, most streets were paved with stone setts. The Augustinian abbey became one of the most important centres of culture in the region – for example, in 1399 one of the earliest texts in the Polish language, the St. Florian's Psalter (Psałterz Floriański), was written here. In 1390 a Gothic stone bridge over the Młynówka River (local branch of Eastern Neisse River) was built by the local lord.

County seat within Bohemia

Kladsko developed rapidly until the start of the Hussite Wars in the 15th century. The wars left the town depopulated by plagues, partially burnt, and demolished by several consecutive floods. In 1459 whole Kłodzko Land was elevated by Bohemian king George of Poděbrady to the status of county – thus the city became a seat of Count (for most of time ruler of Bohemia itself) and local Diet – but still remained integral part of Bohemia as "outer region", and was not counted as part of Silesia. In 1472, the Polish prince Vladislaus Jagiellon stayed in the city before his coronation as King of Bohemia in Prague.

In 1526 the Habsburgs succeeded after the Jagiellons as hereditary kings of Bohemia. Thus the County of Kladsko (hrabství Kladské, Grafschaft Glatz) became a part of the Habsburg monarchy; the local counts retained their powers and Bohemian kings (i.e. Habsburg emperors) ruled this land as suzerains. It was not until the 16th century that the local economy began to recover from the previous wars. In 1540 the sewer system was built. In 1549 the remaining streets were paved and the city hall was refurbished. Most of the houses surrounding the town square were rebuilt in a pure Renaissance style.

In 1617 the first census was organised in the County of Glatz. The city itself had approximately 1,300 houses and over 7,000 inhabitants. However, two years after the census took place the Thirty Years' War started. Between 1619 and 1649 the fortress was besieged several times. Although the fortress was never captured, the city itself was largely destroyed. Over 900 out of 1,300 buildings were destroyed by fire and artillery and the population dropped by more than a half. After the war the Austrian authorities put an end to all local self-government, and the County of Glatz existed in name only. The city was gradually converted into a small garrison town attached to the ever-growing fortress.

Historical population of Kłodzko
1620: 6,500, 1734: 4,400, 1807: 4,549, 1809: 4,887, 1816: 5,510, 1825: 6,187, 1834: 6,644, 1840: 7,654, 1843: 7,777, 1849: 8,222, 1858: 13,052, 1871: 11,545, 1880: 13,701, 1885: 13,588, 1894: 13,501, 1900: 15,015, 1905: 16,052, 1910: 17,121, 1912: 17,284, 2003: 30,100

Kingdom of Prussia

The Kingdom of Prussia annexed Glatz during the 18th century Silesian Wars, although Austrian influence is still evident in the architecture and culture of the region. The construction of the fortress was continued and the town had to bear the costs of the fortress expansion. In 1760 the town was captured by Austrian forces in the Siege of Glatz, but was subsequently returned to Prussia.

Unlike most of Prussian Silesia, Glatz resisted French bombardment during the War of the Fourth Coalition. During the 19th-century Polish national liberation fights, Polish publicist , Polish historian Wojciech Kętrzyński and Polish priest  were imprisoned in the fortress.

Germany
Glatz became part of the German Empire in 1871 during the Prussian-led unification of Germany. The restrictions in the city's growth were not withdrawn until 1877, after which the town began another period of rapid modernisation and expansion. Some of the forts were demolished, several new bridges were built, and new investments started to arrive in Glatz. The town was connected to the rest of Germany by a railway. In 1864 the gas works were built and in 1880 an electric plant was opened. The buildings along the main streets were rebuilt in Neo-Gothic and Neo-Renaissance style while the city walls with all their gates were demolished. In 1884–1885 a new synagogue was built on the Grünestraße [Green Street], designed by the Breslau architect .

The end of the 19th century saw the Kłodzko Valley turned into one of the most popular tourist regions. Many hotels, sanatoria, and spa were opened to the public in the nearby towns of Bad Reinerz (Duszniki Zdrój), Habelschwerdt (Bystrzyca Kłodzka), Bad Altheide (Polanica Zdrój), and Bad Landeck (Lądek-Zdrój). The area of the former county became a popular place among the rich bourgeoisie of Breslau (Wrocław), Berlin, Vienna, and Kraków. In 1910 the city had 17,121 inhabitants: 13,629 Roman Catholics, 3,324 Protestants (mostly members of the Evangelical State Church of Prussia's older Provinces), and 150 Jews. Most of the Jews emigrated and by 1939 there were only 25 of them left.

In September 1938 Glatz was severely damaged by "the flooding of the century", but the damage done was quickly repaired.

Czech claims
The Kłodzko Valley region on the Eastern Neisse River was the focus of several attempts to reincorporate the area into Czechoslovakia after the First World War even though it had a German majority. From the Czech perspective, Kłodzko and Kłodzko Land are culturally and traditionally a part of Bohemia, although the region has been a part of Lower Silesia since its conquest by the Kingdom of Prussia in 1763. These efforts to incorporate Kłodzko into Czechoslovakia would continue into the period after World War II.

World War II

During World War II, the fortress was changed into a prison. At first it was administered by the Abwehr, but was soon taken over by the Gestapo. It was also used as a prisoner-of-war camp for officers of various nationalities. Beginning in 1944, the casemates housed the AEG arms factory evacuated from Łódź. The slave labourers were kept in the stronghold, which was turned into a subcamp of the Gross-Rosen concentration camp. The Germans also established and operated eight forced labour subcamps of the Stalag VIII-B/344 prisoner-of-war camp in the town.

The town itself was not damaged by the war and was taken over by the Soviet Red Army without a major battle on 9 May 1945. However, all the bridges, except the Gothic stone bridge of 1390, were destroyed.

Modern Poland
After the capitulation of Nazi Germany in 1945, the town became part of Poland under border changes promulgated at the Potsdam Conference, which transferred most of Silesia to Poland. The German inhabitants of the town were expelled in accordance to the Potsdam Agreement. The town was repopulated by Poles, some of whom were Polish refugees from former eastern Polish territories annexed by the Soviet Union, from where they had been displaced by Soviet authorities in accordance to new borders decreed at Yalta Conference, while most came from war-devastated central Poland. In May 1945 Czechoslovakia tried to annex the area on behalf of Czech minority (living especially in the western part of the land, called "Czech Corner") and historical claims, but under pressure from the Soviet union the Czech minority was expelled to Czechoslovakia. 

On August 20, 1946, the town was struck by a large tornado, rated by the European Severe Storms Laboratory (ESSL) to have been F2–F4 intensity on the Fujita scale.

In the 1950s and 1960s much of the town centre was damaged by landslides. It turned out that throughout the city's history, generations of Kłodzko's merchants had developed an extensive net of underground basements and tunnels. They were used for storage and, in times of trouble, as a safe shelter from artillery fire. With time the tunnels were forgotten, especially after the original German population was deported, and during the years after World War II many of them started to collapse, along with the houses above. Since the 1970s the tunnels were conserved and the destruction of the city was stopped. Another disaster happened in 1997, when the city was damaged by flooding even greater than that of 1938. However, the town quickly recovered.

On 28 June 1972 the Catholic parishes of Kłodzko were redeployed from the traditional Hradec Králové diocese (est. 1664; Ecclesiastical province of Bohemia) into the Archdiocese of Wrocław. From 1975 to 1998 Kłodzko was administratively part of the former Wałbrzych Voivodeship.

Currently, Kłodzko is one of centres of culture, commerce and tourism in Lower Silesia.

Climate 
The climate is semicontinental although officially it is considered as oceanic (Köppen: Cfb), near of the humid continental (Dfb), considered as such by the isotherm of 0 °C. Located in western Poland where there is the clash of marine air masses and the interior of Siberia, they collide and generate a highly variable climate, although the patterns of the west are predominant.

Tourist attractions

 Gothic bridge – often called a "Charles Bridge in miniature" due to its resemblance to one of the most notable historical monuments of Prague. The bridge survived a flood in 1997. The legend is that the bridge is made from eggs components.
 City tunnels – parts of the tunnels constructed under the city since the 13th century are open for the public
 The Church of Assumption – one of the most notable examples of Gothic architecture in Poland, constructed by the Order of Saint John in the 14th century
 Baroque Church of Our Lady of the Rosary and the Franciscan monastery
 The fortress – a unique stronghold on a high rock overlooking the city, first erected on this spot in the 9th century. During the reign of King Frederick the Great, it was one of the largest fortresses in Prussia.
 Town hall, built in 1890, but the older Gothic-Renaissance tower has been preserved
 
 Marian Column – located at the market square, or the town square. It depicts the Blessed Virgin Mary and was constructed after a plague in 1625. This is a common sight in many other cities and towns that once belonged to the Habsburg monarchy.

Education

Educational establishments in Kłodzko include:
 a branch of the Wrocław-based "Edukacja" College of Management
 the Bolesław Chrobry Lyceum (secondary school)
 Kłodzko's School of Enterprise (secondary school)

Notable residents
 Michael Friedrich von Althann (1680–1734), bishop and politician
 Gustav Adolf von Götzen (1866–1910), explorer 
 Wilhelm Hemprich (1796–1825), scientist
 Emma Ihrer (1857–1911), politician
 Łukasz Krawczuk (born 1989), male sprinter
 Annelies Kupper (1906–1987), opera singer
 Friedrich Wilhelm von Lindeiner-Wildau (1880–1963), Luftwaffe officer
 Gabriela Muskała (born 1969), actress
 Weronika Nowakowska (born 1986), female biathlete
 David Origanus (1558–1628), mathematician
 Ernest of Pardubice (1297–1364), the first Archbishop of Prague
 Johann Christoph Pezel (1639–1694), composer
 Mirosław Pękala (born 1961), former Polish international footballer
 Oswald Rathmann (1891–?), cyclist
 Otto Reche (1879–1966), scientist
 Friedrich Wilhelm Riemer (1774–1845), secretary of Johann Wolfgang von Goethe
 Friedrich Wilhelm Sander (1885–1938), engineer
 Albrecht Schubert (1886–1966), Wehrmacht general
 Renée Sintenis (1888–1965), artist
 Maciej Soboń (born 1979), retired footballer
 Eduard Tauwitz (1812–1894), composer 
 Sophie Charlotte Elisabeth Ursinus (1760–1836), serial killer
 Bogdan Zdrojewski (born 1957), politician

Surroundings
 Stołowe Mountains (Table Mountains) with Stołowe Mountains National Park
 Spa resorts in Polanica-Zdrój, Duszniki-Zdrój, Kudowa-Zdrój & Lądek-Zdrój
 Medieval town of Niemcza
 Cistercian monastery at Henryków
 Wojsławice Arboretum
 Gola Dzierżoniowska Castle

Twin towns – sister cities

Kłodzko is twinned with:

 Bensheim, Germany
 Carvin, France
 Fléron, Belgium
 Limanowa, Poland
 Náchod, Czech Republic
 Rădăuți, Romania
 Rychnov nad Kněžnou, Czech Republic

See also
List of floods in Kłodzko
Kłodzko Land
County of Kladsko (historical)

Notes

External links

Municipal website
Kłodzko commune 
Jewish Community in Kłodzko on Virtual Shtetl
History of the Kladsko/Kłodzko land 
So-called "Czech Corner" in Kladsko/Kłodzko land 

 
Cities and towns in Lower Silesian Voivodeship
Kłodzko County
Cities in Silesia